Daniel Elyakim (born 1953) is a chess player who holds the title of International Correspondence Chess Grandmaster and was the Israeli champion of correspondence chess for the 1986 championship. He lives in Ramat Gan.

Major tournaments that Elyakim played in the past or is playing currently.

Elyakim ICCF rating is 2539 (updated 9.2008) and he holds the 5th place in Israel.

References

External links 
 
 Chess games of Elyakim
 
 

1953 births
Living people
Israeli chess players
Jewish chess players
Israeli Jews
Correspondence chess grandmasters